Exquisite Corpse is the debut EP by American alternative rock band Warpaint, self-released in August 2008 and subsequently re-released on October 6, 2009 on Manimal Vinyl.

Background and release 
Recorded in 2007, the EP was mixed by current-Red Hot Chili Peppers guitarist John Frusciante, and features Red Hot Chili Peppers ex-guitarist Josh Klinghoffer performing drums on "Billie Holiday" and guitar on "Krimson".

Promotional music videos were produced for the tracks "Stars", "Elephants" and "Beetles".

Several of the songs on Exquisite Corpse predated the EP, with some written up to five years earlier. Warpaint was initially formed in February 2004.

Reception 
BBC Music positively reviewed the EP, especially "Billie Holiday", comparing Warpaint favorably to the British band The xx. Sputnikmusic gave the album 3/5 stars, calling the record a "very accomplished" yet "unstructured" debut effort.

Track listing
All songs written by Warpaint. "Billie Holiday" contains a portion of the song "My Guy", written by Smokey Robinson.

Charts

Personnel
Jenny Lee Lindberg – bass
Emily Kokal – guitar, vocals
Theresa Wayman – guitar, vocals, drums ("Krimson")
Shannyn Marie Sossamon – drums, vocals
David Michael Orlando – drums ("Burgundy")
Josh Klinghoffer – drums ("Billie Holiday"), guitar ("Krimson")
John Frusciante – mellotron ("Billie Holiday") [uncredited]

Recording personnel
Jacob Bercovici – producer & engineer
John Frusciante – mixing
Adam Samuels – mixing

Artwork
Mia Cassidy Kirby

References

2008 debut EPs
Warpaint (band) EPs
Manimal Vinyl EPs